Histone H3.3 is a protein that in humans is encoded by the H3F3A and H3F3B genes. It plays an essential role in maintaining genome integrity during mammalian development.

Histones are basic nuclear proteins that are responsible for the nucleosome structure of the chromosomal fiber in eukaryotes. Two molecules of each of the four core histones (H2A, H2B, H3, and H4) form an octamer, around which approximately 146 bp of DNA is wrapped in repeating units, called nucleosomes. The linker histone, H1, interacts with linker DNA between nucleosomes and functions in the compaction of chromatin into higher order structures. This gene contains introns and its mRNA is polyadenylated, unlike most histone genes. The protein encoded is a replication-independent member of the histone H3 family.

Mutation of H3F3A are also linked to certain cancers. p.Lys27Met were discovered in Diffuse Intrinsic Pontine Glioma (DIPG), where they are present 65-75% of tumors and confer a worse prognosis. p.Lys27Met alterations in HIST1H3B and HIST1H3C, which code for histone H3.1 have also been reported in ~10% of DIPG.  H3F3A is also mutated in a smaller portion of pediatric and young adult high grade astrocytomas but more frequently as p.Gly34Arg/Val. Mutations in H3F3A and H3F3B are also found in chondroblastoma and giant cell tumor of bone.

References

Further reading